Platyla lusitanica is a species of very small land snail with an operculum, a terrestrial gastropod mollusk or micromollusk in the family Aciculidae. This species is endemic to Portugal.

References

Endemic molluscs of the Iberian Peninsula
Aciculidae
Gastropods described in 1985
Taxonomy articles created by Polbot